{{DISPLAYTITLE:NOx}}
In atmospheric chemistry,  is shorthand for nitric oxide and nitrogen dioxide, the nitrogen oxides that are most relevant for air pollution.  These gases contribute to the formation of smog and acid rain, as well as affecting tropospheric ozone.

 gases are usually produced from the reaction between nitrogen and oxygen during combustion of fuels, such as hydrocarbons, in air; especially at high temperatures, such as in car engines. In areas of high motor vehicle traffic, such as in large cities, the nitrogen oxides emitted can be a significant source of air pollution.  gases are also produced naturally by lightning.

 does not include nitrous oxide, a fairly inert oxide of nitrogen that contributes less severely to air pollution, notwithstanding its involvement in ozone depletion and high global warming potential.

Formation and reactions 

Because of energy limitations, oxygen and nitrogen do not react at ambient temperatures. But at high temperatures, they undergo an endothermic reaction producing various oxides of nitrogen. Such temperatures arise inside an internal combustion engine or a power station boiler, during the combustion of a mixture of air and fuel, and naturally in a lightning flash.

In atmospheric chemistry, the term  denotes the total concentration of NO and  since the conversion between these two species is rapid in the stratosphere and troposphere.

In other words, the concentration of ozone in the atmosphere is determined by the ratio of these two species.

The time τ that is needed to reach a steady state among  and ozone is dominated by reaction, which reverses reactions+():

for mixing ratio of NO, [NO] = 10 part per billion (ppb), the time constant is 40 minutes; for [NO] = 1 ppb, 4 minutes.

Formation of smog 
When  and volatile organic compounds (VOCs) react in the presence of sunlight, they form photochemical smog, a significant form of air pollution. The presence of photochemical smog increases during the summer when the incident solar radiation is higher. The emitted hydrocarbons from industrial activities and transportation react with NOx quickly and increase the concentration of ozone and peroxide compounds, especially peroxyacetyl nitrate (PAN).

Children, people with lung diseases such as asthma, and people who work or exercise outside are particularly susceptible to adverse effects of smog such as damage to lung tissue and reduction in lung function.

Formation of nitric acid and acid rain 

NO2 is further oxidized in the gas phase during daytime by reaction with OH

NO2 + OH (+M) → HNO3 (+M),

where M denotes a third molecule required to stabilize the addition product. Nitric acid (HNO3) is highly soluble in liquid water in aerosol particles or cloud drops.

NO2 also reacts with ozone to form nitrate radical

NO2 + O3 → NO3 + O2.

During the daytime, NO3 is quickly photolyzed back to NO2, but at night it can react with a second NO2 to form dinitrogen pentoxide.

NO2 + NO3 (+M) → N2O5 (+M).

N2O5 reacts rapidly with liquid water (in aerosol particles or cloud drops, but not in the gas phase) to form HNO3,

N2O5 + H2O(liq) → 2 HNO3(aq)

These are thought to be the principal pathways for formation of nitric acid in the atmosphere. This nitric acid contributes to acid rain or may deposit to soil, where it makes nitrate, which is of use to growing plants. The aqueous phase reaction

2  + H2O → HNO2 + HNO3

is too slow to be of any significance in the atmosphere.

Sources

Natural sources 

Nitric oxide is produced during thunderstorms due to the extreme heating and cooling within a lightning strike. This causes stable molecules such as N2 and O2 to convert into significant amounts of NO similar to the process that occurs during high temperature fuel combustion. NOx from lightning can become oxidized to produce nitric acid (HNO3), this can be precipitated out as acid rain or deposited onto particles in the air. Elevated production of NOx from lightning depends on the season and geographic location. The occurrence of lightning is more common over land near the equator in the inter-tropical convergence zone (ITCZ) during summer months. This area migrates slightly as seasons change. NOx production from lightning can be observed through satellite observations.

Scientists Ott et al. estimated that each flash of lightning on average in the several mid-latitude and subtropical thunderstorms studied turned  of nitrogen into chemically reactive . With 1.4 billion lightning flashes per year, multiplied by 7 kilograms per lightning strike, they estimated the total amount of  produced by lightning per year is 8.6 million tonnes.  However,  emissions resulting from fossil fuel combustion are estimated at 28.5 million tonnes.

A recent discovery indicated that cosmic ray and solar flares can significantly influence the number of lightning strikes occurring on Earth. Therefore, space weather can be a major driving force of lightning-produced atmospheric .  Atmospheric constituents such as nitrogen oxides can be stratified vertically in the atmosphere.  Ott noted that the lightning-produced  is typically found at altitudes greater than 5 km, while combustion and biogenic (soil)  are typically found near the sources at near surface elevation (where it can cause the most significant health effects).

Biogenic sources 

Agricultural fertilization and the use of nitrogen fixing plants also contribute to atmospheric , by promoting nitrogen fixation by microorganisms. The nitrification process transforms ammonia into nitrate. Denitrification is basically the reverse process of nitrification. During denitrification, nitrate is reduced to nitrite, then NO, then N2O and finally nitrogen. Through these processes, NOx is emitted to the atmosphere.

A recent study conducted by the University of California Davis found that adding nitrogen fertilizer to soil in California is contributing 25 percent or more to state-wide NOx pollution levels. When nitrogen fertilizer is added to the soil, excess ammonium and nitrate not used by plants can be converted to NO by microorganisms in the soil, which escapes into the air. NOx is a precursor for smog formation which is already a known issue for the state of California. In addition to contributing to smog, when nitrogen fertilizer is added to the soil and the excess is released in the form of NO, or leached as nitrate this can be a costly process for the farming industry.

A 2018 study by the Indiana University determined that forests in the eastern United States can expect to see increases in NOx and in turn, changes in the types of trees which predominate. Due to human activity and climate change, the maples, sassafras, and tulip poplar have been pushing out the beneficial oak, beech, and hickory. The team determined that the first three tree species, maples, sassafras, and tulip poplar, are associated with ammonia-oxidizing bacteria known to "emit reactive nitrogen from soil." By contrast, the second three tree species, oak, beech and hickory, are associated with microbes that "absorb reactive nitrogen oxides," and thus can have a positive impact on the nitrogen oxide component of air quality. Nitrogen oxide release from forest soils is expected to be highest in Indiana, Illinois, Michigan, Kentucky and Ohio.

Industrial sources (anthropogenic sources) 

 thermal 
 fuel 
 prompt 

Thermal  formation, which is highly temperature dependent, is recognized as the most relevant source when combusting natural gas. Fuel  tends to dominate during the combustion of fuels, such as coal, which have a significant nitrogen content, particularly when burned in combustors designed to minimise thermal . The contribution of prompt  is normally considered negligible. A fourth source, called feed  is associated with the combustion of nitrogen present in the feed material of cement rotary kilns, at between 300 °C and 800 °C, where it is considered a minor contributor.

Thermal 

Thermal  refers to  formed through high temperature oxidation of the diatomic nitrogen found in combustion air. The formation rate is primarily a function of temperature and the residence time of nitrogen at that temperature. At high temperatures, usually above 1300 °C (2600 °F), molecular nitrogen (N2) and oxygen (O2) in the combustion air dissociate into their atomic states and participate in a series of reactions.

The three principal reactions (the extended Zel'dovich mechanism) producing thermal  are:

N2+ O  NO + N
N + O2  NO + O
N + OH{.}  NO + H{.}

All three reactions are reversible. Zeldovich was the first to suggest the importance of the first two reactions. The last reaction of atomic nitrogen with the hydroxyl radical, •HO, was added by Lavoie, Heywood and Keck to the mechanism and makes a significant contribution to the formation of thermal .

Fuel 

It is estimated that transportation fuels cause 54% of the anthropogenic (i.e. human-caused) . The major source of  production from nitrogen-bearing fuels such as certain coals and oil, is the conversion of fuel bound nitrogen to  during combustion. During combustion, the nitrogen bound in the fuel is released as a free radical and ultimately forms free N2, or NO. Fuel  can contribute as much as 50% of total emissions through the combusting oil and as much as 80% through the combusting of coal.

Although the complete mechanism is not fully understood, there are two primary pathways of formation. The first involves the oxidation of volatile nitrogen species during the initial stages of combustion. During the release and before the oxidation of the volatiles, nitrogen reacts to form several intermediaries which are then oxidized into NO. The second pathway involves the combustion of nitrogen contained in the char matrix during the combustion of the char portion of the fuels. This reaction occurs much more slowly than the volatile phase.

Prompt 

Nitrogen oxides are released during manufacturing of nitrogen fertilizers. Though nitrous oxide is emitted during its application, it is then reacted in atmosphere to form nitrogen oxides. This third source is attributed to the reaction of atmospheric nitrogen, N2, with radicals such as C, CH, and CH2 fragments derived from fuel, rather than thermal or fuel processes. Occurring in the earliest stage of combustion, this results in the formation of fixed species of nitrogen such as NH (nitrogen monohydride), NCN (diradical cyanonitrene), HCN (hydrogen cyanide), •H2CN (dihydrogen cyanide) and •CN (cyano radical) which can oxidize to NO. In fuels that contain nitrogen, the incidence of prompt  is comparatively small and it is generally only of interest for the most exacting emission targets.

Health and environment effects 
There is strong evidence that  respiratory exposure can trigger and exacerbate existing asthma symptoms, and may even lead to the development of asthma over longer periods of time. It has also been associated with heart disease, diabetes, birth outcomes, and all-cause mortality, but these nonrespiratory effects are less well-established.

 reacts with ammonia, moisture, and other compounds to form nitric acid vapor and related particles.

 reacts with volatile organic compounds in the presence of sunlight to form ozone. Ozone can cause adverse effects such as damage to lung tissue and reduction in lung function mostly in susceptible populations (children, elderly, asthmatics). Ozone can be transported by wind currents and cause health impacts far from the original sources. The American Lung Association estimates that nearly 50 percent of United States inhabitants live in counties that are not in ozone compliance. In South East England, ground level ozone pollution tends to be highest in the countryside and in suburbs, while in central London and on major roads NO emissions are able to "mop up" ozone to form  and oxygen.

 also readily reacts with common organic chemicals, and even ozone, to form a wide variety of toxic products: nitroarenes, nitrosamines and also the nitrate radical some of which may cause DNA mutations. Recently another pathway, via , to ozone has been found that predominantly occurs in coastal areas via formation of nitryl chloride when  comes into contact with salt mist.

The direct effect of the emission of  has positive contribution to the greenhouse effect. Instead of reacting with ozone in Reaction 3, NO can also react with HO2· and organic peroxyradicals (RO2·) and thus increase the concentration of ozone. Once the concentration of  exceeds a certain level, atmospheric reactions result in net ozone formation.

There are also other indirect effects of  that can either increase or decrease the greenhouse effect. First of all, through the reaction of NO with HO2 radicals, •OH radicals are recycled, which oxidize methane molecules, meaning  emissions can counter the effect of greenhouse gases. For instance, ship traffic emits a great amount of NOx which provides a source of NOx over the ocean. Then, photolysis of NO2 leads to the formation of ozone and the further formation of hydroxyl radicals (·OH) through ozone photolysis. Since the major sink of methane in the atmosphere is by reaction with •OH radicals, the NOx emissions from ship travel may lead to a net global cooling. However,  in the atmosphere may undergo dry or wet deposition and return to land in the form of HNO3/NO3−. Through this way, the deposition leads to nitrogen fertilization and the subsequent formation of nitrous oxide (N2O) in soil, which is another greenhouse gas. In conclusion, considering several direct and indirect effects,  emissions have a negative contribution to global warming.

 in the atmosphere is removed through several pathways. During daytime, NO2 reacts with hydroxyl radicals (·OH) and forms nitric acid (HNO3), which can easily be removed by dry and wet deposition. Organic peroxyradicals (RO2·) can also react with NO and NO2 and result in the formation of organic nitrates. These are ultimately broken down to inorganic nitrate, which is a useful nutrient for plants. During nighttime, NO2 and NO can form nitrous acid (HONO) through surface-catalyzed reaction. Although the reaction is relatively slow, it is an important reaction in urban areas. In addition, the nitrate radical (NO3) is formed by the reaction between NO2 and ozone. At night, NO3 further reacts with NO2 and establishes an equilibrium reaction with dinitrogen pentoxide (N2O5). Via heterogeneous reaction, N2O5 reacts with water vapor or liquid water and forms nitric acid (HNO3).

Biodiesel and  

Biodiesel and its blends in general are known to reduce harmful tailpipe emissions such as: carbon monoxide; particulate matter (PM), otherwise known as soot; and unburned hydrocarbon emissions.  While earlier studies suggested biodiesel could sometimes decrease  and sometimes increase  emissions, subsequent investigation has shown that blends of up to 20% biodiesel in USEPA-approved diesel fuel have no significant impact on  emissions compared with regular diesel. The state of California uses a special formulation of diesel fuel to produce less  relative to diesel fuel used in the other 49 states.  This has been deemed necessary by the California Air Resources Board (CARB) to offset the combination of vehicle congestion, warm temperatures, extensive sunlight, PM, and topography that all contribute to the formation of ozone and smog.  CARB has established a special regulation for Alternative Diesel Fuels to ensure that any new fuels, including biodiesel, coming into the market do not substantially increase  emissions. The reduction of  emissions is one of the most important challenges for advances in vehicle technology. While diesel vehicles sold in the US since 2010 are dramatically cleaner than previous diesel vehicles, urban areas continue to seek more ways to reduce the formation of smog and ozone.  formation during combustion is associated with a number of factors such as combustion temperature.  As such, it can be observed that the vehicle drive cycle, or the load on the engine have more significant impact on  emissions than the type of fuel used.  This may be especially true for modern, clean diesel vehicles that continuously monitor engine operation electronically and actively control engine parameters and exhaust system operations to limit  emission to less than 0.2 g/km.  Low-temperature combustion or LTC technology may help reduce thermal formation of  during combustion, however a tradeoff exists as high temperature combustion produces less PM or soot and results in greater power and fuel efficiency.

Regulation and emission control technologies 
Selective catalytic reduction (SCR) and selective non-catalytic reduction (SNCR) reduce post combustion  by reacting the exhaust with urea or ammonia to produce nitrogen and water. SCR is now being used in ships, diesel trucks and in some diesel cars. The use of exhaust gas recirculation and catalytic converters in motor vehicle engines have significantly reduced vehicular emissions.  was the main focus of the Volkswagen emissions violations.

Other technologies such as flameless oxidation (FLOX) and staged combustion significantly reduce thermal  in industrial processes. Bowin low  technology is a hybrid of staged-premixed-radiant combustion technology with major surface combustion preceded by minor radiant combustion. In the Bowin burner, air and fuel gas are premixed at a ratio greater than or equal to the stoichiometric combustion requirement. Water Injection technology, whereby water is introduced into the combustion chamber, is also becoming an important means of  reduction through increased efficiency in the overall combustion process. Alternatively, the water (e.g. 10 to 50%) is emulsified into the fuel oil before the injection and combustion. This emulsification can either be made in-line (unstabilized) just before the injection or as a drop-in fuel with chemical additives for long-term emulsion stability (stabilized). Excessive water addition facilitates hot corrosion, which is the primary reason why dry low- technologies are favored today besides the requirement of a more complex system.

References 

Airborne pollutants
Smog